The 177th Armored Brigade is an AC/RC unit based at Camp Shelby, Mississippi. The unit is responsible for training selected United States Army Reserve and National Guard units. The unit was formerly designated as 3rd Brigade, 87th Division. The brigade is a subordinate unit of First Army.

The brigade has been re-designated and re-missioned several times:
During the World War I, the Brigade was infantry and fought as part of the 89th Infantry Division.
In 1986, the Brigade assumed the mission as the Opposing Force (OPFOR) at the National Training Center (NTC) at Fort Irwin, California. The Brigade consisted of 2 battalions: 6th Battalion, 31st Infantry (6–31 IN) and 1st Battalion, 73rd Armor (1–73 AR). On the NTC battlefield, the 177th portrayed the fictitious, Guards 60th Motorized Rifle Division, which was based upon Soviet Army structure and doctrine. 
In 1988 the Brigade re-designated several units and activated others. 6–31 IN became 1–52 IN, 1–73 AR became 1–63 AR. Activated were the 177th Support Battalion, 177th Military Intelligence Company, 164th Chemical Company and the 87th Engineer Company.
On 26 October 1994, as part of the post-Cold War draw down, the Brigade was inactivated and re-flagged as the 11th Armored Cavalry Regiment.
Reactivated 24 October 1997 at Camp Shelby, Mississippi as an Army Reserve training unit and inactivated on 16 October 1999 and reflagged as 3rd Brigade, 87th Division (Training) 
On 1 December 2006 the 177th was reactivated at Camp Shelby, Mississippi under 1st Army-East.

Organization

1917–1919
 Headquarters, 177th Brigade
 353rd Infantry Regiment
 354th Infantry Regiment
 341st Machine Gun Battalion

1942–1943
 89th Reconnaissance Troop, 89th Division

1943–1944
 Troop A, 4th Reconnaissance Squadron

1944–1945
 Troop A, 34th Cavalry Reconnaissance Squadron, Mechanized

1986–1988
 HHC, 177th Armored Brigade
 6th Battalion, 31st Infantry
 1st Battalion, 73d Armor

1988–1994
 HHC, 177th Armored Brigade
 1st Battalion, 52d Infantry
 1st Battalion, 63d Armor
 177th Support Battalion
 87th Engineer Company
 177th Military Intelligence Company 
 164th Chemical Company

2007
As of 2007, the unit is composed of:
 HHC, 177th Armored Brigade
 1st Battalion, 346th Regiment
 2nd Battalion, 349th Regiment
 3rd Battalion, 349th Regiment
 2nd Battalion, 410th Field Artillery (Training Support)
 1st Battalion, 350th Regiment
 2nd Battalion, 350th Regiment

2019
As of October 2019, the Brigade is composed of:
 HHD, 177th Armored Brigade
 1st Battalion, 305th Regiment (Infantry)
 2nd Battalion, 305th Regiment (Artillery)
 3rd Battalion, 315th Regiment (Engineer)
 2nd Battalion, 346th Regiment (CS/CSS)
 3rd Battalion, 347th Regiment (CS/CSS)
 2nd Battalion, 348th Regiment (CS/CSS)
 3rd Battalion, 348th Regiment (CS/CSS)
 3rd Battalion, 349th Regiment (Logistics Support)
 2nd Battalion, 351st Regiment (Infantry)
 2nd Battalion, 410th Regiment (Brigade Support Battalion)

Campaign participation credit

Decorations

For further information see The Brigade, A History by John J. McGrath from the Combat Studies Institute Press, Fort Leavenworth, Kansas.

References

External links
 Lineage & Honors for 3rd Brigade, 87th Division
 USAR Overview
 Fort Irwin's history of the OPFOR
 Global Security's page for 3/87th Division

177
Military units and formations established in 1917